Annika Zell is a Swedish orienteering and ski-orienteering competitor, and world champion in ski-orienteering. In May 2018, it was announced that she would coach Team Sweden in women's cross-country skiing together with Magnus Ingesson beginning in the 2018–2019 season. On 17 April 2019, she announced she would leave that position.

Ski orienteering
Zell won an individual gold medal in the long course at the 1992 World Ski Orienteering Championships in Pontarlier, and again in 1996 in Lillehammer. She won the short distance in 1998.

She finished second in the overall World Cup in Ski Orienteering in 1991 and in 2000, and  finished third in 1999.

Foot orienteering
Zell won the multi-day orienteering race O-Ringen both in 1993 and in 1996. She finished fifth in the overall Orienteering World Cup in 1992.

References

External links
 

Year of birth missing (living people)
Living people
Swedish orienteers
Female orienteers
Ski-orienteers
Foot orienteers
20th-century Swedish women